Goala may refer to:

Vedea, Teleorman, formerly Goala, a commune in Romania
Goala, Burkina Faso, a town in the Sahara
Goala, herdsman community of south india.
Goala, herdsman community of east india.